Sao José de Ribamar is a Brazilian municipality in the Maranhão state. 179,028 was its estimated population in 2020. It is part of the São Luís Island together with São Luís, Raposa, and Paço do Lumiar.

The municipality contains part of the  Upaon-Açu/Miritiba/Alto Preguiças Environmental Protection Area, created in 1992.

References

Populated coastal places in Maranhão
Municipalities in Maranhão